Silvia Farina and Barbara Schett were the defending champions but only Schett competed that year with Patty Schnyder.

Schett and Schnyder lost in the final 6–4, 6–2 against Pavlina Stoyanova and Elena Wagner.

Seeds
Champion seeds are indicated in bold text while text in italics indicates the round in which those seeds were eliminated.

 Barbara Schett /  Patty Schnyder (final)
 Kristie Boogert /  Miriam Oremans (quarterfinals)
 Radka Bobková /  Caroline Schneider (first round)
 Pavlina Stoyanova /  Elena Wagner (champions)

Draw

External links
 1998 Internazionali Femminili di Palermo Doubles Draw

Internazionali Femminili di Palermo
1998 WTA Tour